Ibeth Zamora Silva (born 6 February 1989) is a Mexican professional boxer. She is a two-division world champion, having held the WBC female flyweight title from 2018 to 2021 and previously the WBC light flyweight title from 2013 to 2017, as well as the WBA interim female mini flyweight title from 2009 to 2011.

Professional career
Silva made her professional debut on 5 May 2007, scoring a four-round unanimous decision (UD) victory against Ana Arrazola in Metepec, Mexico. Silva won her next fight via split decision (SD) against Esmeralda Moreno in August, before suffering her first career defeat by majority decision (MD) in a rematch with Moreno for the Mexico interim female flyweight title on 23 February 2008 in Toluca, Mexico. Two judges scored the bout 97–93 while the third scored it a draw at 96–96. Following two points decision (PTS) wins, she defeated Anabel Ortiz via PTS to capture the Mexico female light flyweight title on 21 November 2008 at Salon Marbet Plus in Ciudad Nezahualcóyotl, Mexico.

In her next fight she challenged WBA light flyweight champion Yésica Bopp on 8 August 2009 at Palacio Peñarol in Montevideo, Uruguay. Silva suffered the second defeat of her career via UD, with the scorecards reading 97–93, 99–91 and 99–92. She moved down a weight class for her next fight to capture the WBA interim female mini flyweight title on 5 September at the Roberto Durán Arena in Panama City, Panama, defeating Ana Fernandez via UD with scores of 88–82, 87–83 and 86–84. Silva successfully defended her interim title a month later against Marisol Molina via third-round technical knockout (TKO), before capturing the vacant WBC Youth female mini flyweight title on 24 June 2010, defeating Patricia Hernandez by second-round TKO at the Jose Cuervo Salon in Mexico City. She successfully defended her WBC Youth title three times before facing WBA mini flyweight champion Etsuko Tada on 17 April 2011, at the Yomiuri Bunka Hall in Toyonaka, Japan. Silva lost in her second attempt at a world title with scores of 96–94, 98–93 and 98–92.

Following the defeat to Tada, Silva moved back up to light flyweight to capture the vacant WBC Youth female light flyweight title, defeating Susana Perez via third-round TKO on 11 June at Deportivo Trabajadores del Metro in Mexico City. She defended the title three times before losing it to Jessica Nery Plata by SD on 21 April 2012 at the Estadio José Lerma Pérez in Ocoyoacac, Mexico.

She lost her next fight, again by SD, against Irma Sánchez in June. After a UD win against Fredee Gonzalez in January 2013, she defeated Naoko Shibata by SD to capture the vacant WBC female light flyweight title on 3 March 2013 at the Korakuen Hall in Tokyo, Japan. Two judges scored the bout 96–94 in favour of Silva while the third scored it 96–94 to Shibata. She would go on to defend her WBC light flyweight title eight times; against Maricela Quintero in June and Ava Knight in October 2013; Jessica Chávez in November 2014; Jolene Blackshear in May and a third fight with Esmeralda Moreno in September 2015; Mari Ando in March, Keisher McLeod-Wells in July and Nina Radovanovic in November 2016. Her title reign came to an end when she faced Esmeralda Moreno for the fourth time in her career, on 22 April 2017 at Unidad Deportiva Martín Alarcón in Metepec, Mexico. Two judges scored the bout 95–94 and 96–93 in favour of Moreno while the third scored it 96–93 to Silva.

Six months after losing her WBC light flyweight title, she moved up a division to compete at flyweight, defeating Isabel Millan by UD in October before facing Melissa McMorrow for the vacant WBC female flyweight title. The bout took place on 26 May 2018 at the Teatro Molière in Mexico City. Silva defeated McMorrow by UD to become a two-weight world champion, with the scorecards reading 100–90 and 98–92 twice.

Professional boxing record

References

Living people
1989 births
Mexican women boxers
Mini-flyweight boxers
Light-flyweight boxers
Flyweight boxers
World Boxing Council champions
Boxers from the State of Mexico
People from Toluca